Marcel Sembat (19 October 1862 – 5 September 1922) was a French Socialist politician. He served as a member of the National Assembly of France from 1893 to 1922, and as Minister of Public Works from August 26, 1914, to December 12, 1916.

Biography

Early life
Marcel Sembat was born on October 19, 1862, in Bonnières-sur-Seine, Seine-et-Oise, France.  He went to school in Mantes-la-Jolie, attended the Collège Stanislas in Paris and later received a PhD in law.

Journalism
He started a career in journalism and co-founded the Revue de l'évolution. From 1890 to 1897, he was the editor of La Petite République, created by Leon Gambetta. It was then that he became a Socialist. He also wrote for La Revue socialiste, La Revue de l'enseignement primaire, Documents du Progrès, La Lanterne, Petit sou and Paris-Journal. He later became an editor of L'Humanité.

Politics
He served as member of the Chamber of Deputies of France from 1893 to 1922. A socialist, he supported workers' rights during strikes. He oversaw the construction of telephone cables from Brest, France to Dakar, Senegal. He supported Algerians against French colonialists in French Algeria. He was opposed to the presence of French Christian missionaries in China.

He served as Minister of Public Works from 1914 to 1916, under Prime Ministers René Viviani and Aristide Briand.

Personal life
On February 27, 1897, he married the Fauvist painter and sculptor Georgette Agutte. He wrote a book about Henri Matisse.

Death
He died of cerebral hemorrhage on September 5, 1922, in Chamonix, Haute-Savoie, France.

Legacy
The station of the Paris Métro Marcel Sembat is named for him.
The Lycée Marcel Sembat in Sotteville-lès-Rouen is named for him.
Boulevard Agutte-Sembat in Grenoble is named for his wife and him.

Bibliography
Leur Bilan, quatre ans de pouvoir Clemenceau-Briand (Paris, Librairie du Parti socialiste S.F.I.O., 1910)
Faites un roi, sinon faites la paix (E. Figuière et Cie : Paris, 1911)
Henri Matisse, trente reproductions de peintures et dessins, précédées d'une étude critique par Marcel Sembat, de notices biographiques et documentaires (Paris : Éditions de la Nouvelle revue française, 1920)
La Victoire en déroute (prefaced by Léon Blum, Paris : Éditions du Progrès civique, 1925)

References

External links
 

1862 births
1922 deaths
People from Yvelines
Politicians from Île-de-France
Socialist Revolutionary Party (France) politicians
French Socialist Party (1902) politicians
French Section of the Workers' International politicians
French Ministers of Public Works
Members of the 6th Chamber of Deputies of the French Third Republic
Members of the 7th Chamber of Deputies of the French Third Republic
Members of the 8th Chamber of Deputies of the French Third Republic
Members of the 9th Chamber of Deputies of the French Third Republic
Members of the 10th Chamber of Deputies of the French Third Republic
Members of the 11th Chamber of Deputies of the French Third Republic
Members of the 12th Chamber of Deputies of the French Third Republic
Writers from Île-de-France
French male writers
Collège Stanislas de Paris alumni